Three Wolf Moon is a T-shirt featuring three wolves howling at the Moon.  The numerous satirical reviews for this on Amazon.com have become an Internet phenomenon.  The T-shirt was designed by artist Antonia Neshev.

Origin

The Three Wolf Moon T-shirt, created by The Mountain Corporation, gained popularity after attracting sarcastic reviews on Amazon.com attributing great power to it, such as making the wearer irresistible to women, striking fear into other males, and having magical healing abilities.  Brian Govern, a law student at Rutgers University, was searching for a school book on Amazon and was led to the Three Wolf Moon T-shirt by an Amazon recommendation which had been targeted at students purchasing college semester books.  He decided to write a review of the shirt on a whim as he did not actually own the shirt. His faux-serious review as "Bee-Dot-Govern" in November 2008 concluded:

Since this original review was posted, more than 2,300 similar reviews have been posted.  Some reviewers have uploaded images showing famous people wearing the shirt.

The shirt attracted further interest when it became popular on networking sites such as Digg and Facebook and was then lauded in conventional media as an Internet phenomenon.  German scholar Melvin Haack considers it to be a notable example of a redneck joke.  The reviews have been included in studies of such online sarcasm.  Such sarcasm tends to confound analysis of customer reviews and so the texts have been analysed to determine which elements might identify sarcasm.  One common example found in n-gram analysis was "alpha male".

Sales
The T-shirt is manufactured by The Mountain Corporation, a wholesale clothing company in Keene, New Hampshire, United States.  Their art director, Michael McGloin, said that they were making many more shirts in response to the great demand which had made it the top-selling item in Amazon's clothing store. Due to the success of the shirt, the New Hampshire Division of Economic Development made it their "official New Hampshire T-shirt of economic development" and awarded it as a prize for innovation.

Parodies and attributions
A similar shirt featuring Keyboard Cats instead of wolves has been produced at the T-shirt design site Threadless. In July 2009, this was the most highly rated design there.

Capcom prepared a limited run through iam8bit of a "Three Wolf God Sun" shirt for the 2010 San Diego Comic-Con International, featuring images of the wolf gods Shiranui, Amaterasu and Chibiterasu from their video games Ōkami and Ōkamiden.

Minecraft parodied the design in its merchandise, replacing the wolves with creepers, an enemy featured in the game.

Georgetown University created a parody of the "Three Wolf Moon" shirt using images of their mascot Jack the Bulldog as a promotion for students attending a 2015 basketball game.

References

External links
Artist's website

T-shirts
Internet memes
Canines in popular culture
Wolves
Amazon (company)
Moon in culture